The Elverum Authorization allowed the Cabinet of Norway to temporarily and legitimately assert absolute authority given that the Storting (the Norwegian parliament) was no longer able to convene in ordinary session in Oslo. The action was approved unanimously by the Storting in the town of Elverum on 9 April 1940, after the Norwegian Royal Family, the Cabinet, and the Storting had evacuated Oslo to evade capture by German troops in the course of Operation Weserübung during World War II.

Text
The authorization reads, in translated form:

Significance
The authorization is of historical significance because it allowed the Norwegian executive branch to assert legitimacy – even while in exile.

Debate
The authorization is controversial in that it constituted a complete abandonment of the legislative powers in Norway during the war. The issue was brought to the Supreme Court of Norway, which ruled that the authorization was legitimate and valid.

Critics have stated that the authorization was invalid because there was no constitutional basis for the Storting to dissolve itself in such a manner. These critics also claim that Section 17 – which was invoked in the authorization – only authorized emergency powers within the areas of "trade", "customs", "economy", and "police" until the Storting could be seated again.

Germany demanded the king to appoint Vidkun Quisling as prime minister. He refused, but if he had done that, together with the Elverum Authorization, Quisling would have got a formal right to be dictator of Norway. Instead Quisling was the dictator only on authorization of Hitler and the German troops.

Result
In any event, the legitimacy of the exiled government was to little extent called into question during the war, except by the Quisling government and the German occupying power. Tormod Otter Johansen, a professor with the University of Gothenburg's Law Department, later noted that "It is not difficult to see the emergency during an occupation, and the resistance that the government and resistance movement felt necessary to engage in on the basis of this emergency. The legal argument for constitutional necessity seems pertinent to this case, since there can be no greater ‘constitutional’ threat than the occupation and dissolving of the existing state. The threat to human life and security by the occupants further motivated the use of emergency powers."

References

Norway in World War II
Politics of World War II
1940 in Norway
Elverum
1940 documents
1940 in law